Macedonian Prayer (Macedonian Cyrillic: Македонска молитва - Makedonska molitva) was a short film, functioning as a public service video produced in December 2008 and aired daily for the first several weeks of 2009 on a nationwide scale in Republic of Macedonia by the public TV station MRT. It was met with controversy, with a number of commentators from the country and from abroad depicting it as "blasphemous", "racist" and "fascist". It is a 9 minutes long video spot of (when it was aired) non-commercial nature, in color with stereo sound, which contains a male-voice monologue followed by another male monologue, superimposed on opening background in Eastern Orthodox Christian hymn style as well as tonal music and some sound effects. The airing of the video ceased permanently after few weeks, apparently on MRT's editorial discretion, as well as international pressure.

Content 

The video is authored by Niče Dimovski, vice-president of the NGO "World Macedonian Congress" based in Skopje. It contains a variety of video samples of original production, archival-documentary, movie clips etc., most of them featuring Ancient Macedonian, Roman, Byzantine scenery and symbols, as well as landscapes.

The first monologue contains a prayer towards God in which grievances, alleged historical facts, laments over former and current issues and alleged low status of ethnic Macedonians in general were delivered. The male vocal also complains about worldwide-reaching conspiracy by neighbors of ethnic Macedonians to falsify the historical truth at the disadvantage of Macedonians.

After a pause, God answers in to all Macedonians, stating that he created them as Macedonoids – progenitors of the White race, besides two other races he created, the  Mongoloids and the Negroids, while all the rest were Mulattoes, providing blessings to ethnic Macedonians and revealing eschatological role of ethnic Macedonian people, stating that he will soon arrive in the Republic of Macedonia to state the truth, open graves, including Alexander the Great's one, and bring all of the world to bow in front of Macedonia, which will cause understanding that Macedonians have divine primacy that is to be revealed causing the awe of all humankind.

Reactions 

The video caused immediate controversy within intellectual and journalist elite within Republic of Macedonia, mostly of condemnatory nature.  It did stir quite a lot of polemics and mostly condemnation from variety of commentators, including NGO leaders. It was also caused outrage amongst international, particularly Western, academics.

One of subsequent effects of this video is the usage of the term "Makedonoidi" as a pejorative slang-term of choice for zealous supporters of the theory that today's ethnic Macedonians have ethnically, linguistically, historically preserved the culture of Ancient Macedonians, which were, according to them, not Greeks (see "Antiquization" for more).

See also
Macedonian nationalism
United Macedonia

References

External links
 Macedonian Prayer - Makedonska Molitva in integral, non-adulterated full version on YouTube.
 Integral full version of the video on YouTube, with prior and subsequent political and derivative authorship statements, subtitled in English.
 "Macedonian Prayer Featuring God Himself", article by Siniša Jakov - Marušić on "Balkan Insight".
 "Македонска молитва" против здравиот разум ("Makedonska Molitva protiv zdraviot razum"/"Macedonian Prayer against the sane mind") by Sunčica Unevska, online edition of "Utrinski Vesnik" ("Утрински Весник") daily, 1 March 2009.
 "Press Release: Pan-Macedonian Association", 3 February 2009, on "Hellenes Online"

2009 films
2009 short films
2009 television films
Mass media in North Macedonia
National mysticism
Politics of North Macedonia